Chinese House may refer to:

 Chinese House (Potsdam), a garden pavilion in Sanssouci Park in Potsdam, Germany
 Chinese House, Reed College, Portland, Oregon, USA

Buildings and structures disambiguation pages